Kuo Shou Ching is a small lunar impact crater that is located in the northwestern part of the walled plain Hertzsprung, on the far side of the Moon. This is an oval-shaped crater that is elongated along the north–south axis. The rim edge is well-defined and not noticeably eroded. The inner walls are simple slopes that descend to the interior floor.

References

 
 
 
 
 
 
 
 
 
 
 
 

Impact craters on the Moon